Manuel Pérez Subirana (born 1971) is a Spanish writer. He was born in Barcelona, where he studied law at university. His first novel Lo importante es perder was published in 2003. His second book Egipto was nominated for the Premio Herralde in 2005.

References

Spanish male novelists
1971 births
Living people
Writers from Barcelona
Date of birth missing (living people)
21st-century Spanish male writers
21st-century Spanish novelists